The 2002 Open Gaz de France was a women's tennis tournament played on indoor hard courts at the Stade Pierre de Coubertin in Paris in France that was part of Tier II of the 2002 WTA Tour. It was the tenth edition of the tournament and was held from 4 February through 9 February 2002. First-seeded Venus Williams won the singles title.

Finals

Singles

 Venus Williams defeated  Jelena Dokić by walkover
 It was Williams' 2nd title of the year and the 32nd title of her career.

Doubles

 Nathalie Dechy /  Meilen Tu defeated  Elena Dementieva /  Janette Husárová by walkover
 It was Dechy's only title of the year and the 1st title of her career. It was Tu's only title of the year and the 2nd of her career.

External links 
 ITF tournament edition details

Open Gaz de France
Open GDF Suez
2002 in French women's sport
Open Gaz de France
Open Gaz de France
Open Gaz de France